Phupoom Pongpanupak, better known by his nickname Ken (เคน), is a Thai actor known for his leading role in the Thai television soap opera Saam Num Nua Thong. He is the one of the top Thai actors in Thailand knowing for his project films including of his best friends Mario Maurer, Nadech Kugimiya and Prin Suparat.

Early life
Phupoom was born on October 20, 1991, and raised in Sing Buri Province, Thailand. He is the only child in his family. Phupoom graduated with a bachelor's degree from the Faculty of Business Administration in Finance, University of the Thai Chamber of Commerce.

Career
Phupoom started his career in 2011 as an actor in a Thai film in Fabulous 30. In 2012 Pongpanu was included in the Thai list along with Witwisit Hiranyawongkul and Mario Maurer, when he played in a Thai romantic drama film Love of Siam with them. In 2019, Phupoom decided not to renew the contract with Channel 3 and became a freelance actor. His first drama as a freelance actor will be My Lovely Bodyguard with Wannarot Sonthichai.

Personal life
Phupoom is dating actress Esther Supreeleela. They have been together for 5 years. It was revealed that they first met during a photo shoot for "Honeymoon Travel Magazine".

Filmography

Films

Television dramas

Television shows

MC
 Online 
 2019 : เคนเอสเธอร์ที่เกาหลี On Air YouTube: KenAndEsther Official
 2021 : We Plant Grow On Air YouTube: KenAndEsther Official

Concerts

References

External links
 
 

1991 births
Living people
Phupoom Pongpanu
Phupoom Pongpanu
Phupoom Pongpanu
Phupoom Pongpanu
Phupoom Pongpanu
Phupoom Pongpanu
Phupoom Pongpanu
Phupoom Pongpanu
Phupoom Pongpanu
Phupoom Pongpanu